Peter Crepin (born November 5, 1952) is a retired Canadian football player who played for the Ottawa Rough Riders and Winnipeg Blue Bombers of the Canadian Football League (CFL). He played junior football for the Ottawa Sooners.

References

1952 births
Living people
Canadian football defensive backs
Ottawa Rough Riders players
Winnipeg Blue Bombers players
Players of Canadian football from Ontario
Canadian football people from Ottawa